"You Don't Want to Know" is the eighth episode of the fourth season of the American TV drama House and the seventy-eighth episode overall.  It aired on 20 November 2007. Notably, in this episode the differential diagnosis is confirmed as lupus despite the fact that 'It's not lupus - it's never lupus' is a phrase often used to the point of catchphrase by the eponymous Dr. Gregory House.

Plot

Medicine
Kutner and Cole are in the audience of a magic show in a night club in Atlantic City. Flynn, the magician on stage (played by Steve Valentine), is replicating Harry Houdini's famous Chinese Water Torture Cell act, calling Cole up to the stage.  Wrapped in chains, Flynn is dropped in the tank and loses consciousness as soon as he enters the water.

Kutner suggests taking the case of the magician. He wants to run tests to find out why Flynn's heart stopped in the water, though House is sure the magician has lost consciousness because he screwed up the trick and drowned. He permits Kutner to test the patient, but he says that he will fire Kutner if the patient's problems were a result of screwing up the trick.

Flynn says that he is a great magician, and did not fail to carry out the trick. To demonstrate, Flynn asks Thirteen to pick a card from a deck, and then asks Kutner for his wallet. The wallet bursts into flames, and when it is extinguished, the card she picked is in it.

Kutner tells Foreman that the tests show there was no cause for the heart failure. Foreman suggests running a lung MRI, but Flynn starts bleeding internally as soon as they start the MRI. He has had three units of AB positive blood transfusions, so Thirteen wonders if he has had an intestinal infarct. House realizes what caused the problems with the MRI. While Flynn is being operated on, House steps in, sticks his hand in Flynn's gut, and pulls out a key. Flynn had swallowed the key for the magic trick, then the MRI's magnet had ripped it through his intestines.

House confronts Flynn, but Flynn still insists that he is a great magician. To demonstrate, Flynn has House pick a card. Then he throws the deck of cards at the wall. A card sticks to the window, but is not the card House picked. House removes the card and is about to scold the magician when he sees his card stuck on the other side of the glass wall. House cannot figure out how he did the trick. Suddenly, the magician starts to bleed profusely out of his nose. House realizes something is still wrong, and Flynn's cardiac arrest is actually a symptom of something more serious. House gathers the Fellows in his office. Amber suggests that Flynn has Polyarteritis nodosa. Taub throws out the possibility that the nose bleed was caused by cocaine. House tells Taub and Kutner to go to the patient's home. He orders Amber and Cole to do a biopsy of Flynn's heart.

Kutner and Taub find an old fortune-telling machine, rabbits and marijuana in Flynn's home. Taub theorizes that the rabbits could have given Flynn pericarditis from a tick. House demands to know how Flynn did the card trick earlier. Flynn says it is more interesting not to know how it is done, but House says it is better to know. House diagnoses Flynn with tularemia from his rabbits. Flynn now has bleeding around his heart, which could be a sign of cancer. House tells his fellows to find where the cancer is located.

Flynn predicts that he will be dead by the next day; the doctors confirm as much, given the rate of Flynn's massive amount of internal bleeding. Kutner considers a tainted blood transfusion. Foreman says that the low immunoglobulin levels and the other symptoms indicate amyloidosis. Flynn has had a grand mal seizure, then kidney failure. House believes that this proves the diagnosis of amyloidosis, and not a bad blood transfusion as Kutner suggested, and that the patient needs a bone marrow transplant. Since the procedure requires irradiation, House orders a subcutaneous fat biopsy to confirm his diagnosis. House says that while they are waiting for the results of the biopsy, the fellows can check their blood theory. The biopsy ends up being inconclusive, and by the time it is done, the fellows still have not confirmed their blood theory. They ask for more time, but House says the patient cannot wait for their tests to finish. So instead House suggests that they test the blood by giving it to him and see if he gets sick, since he has the universal recipient blood type.

House does get sick, but his symptoms are different from the patients, so he says it is irrelevant, and insists that the patient has amyloidosis. He refuses to let the fellows examine him; but Thirteen, having drugged his tea, tests his organs after he passes out (House realizes this when he wakes up).

Wilson stops by House's office to see how he is. They discuss their blood types, which prompts House to realize that the patient's symptoms might be because they gave him the wrong type of blood. Flynn tells House he is type-A blood, but they had given him type AB based on what antibodies he produced, so House deduces that his body is making an extra antibody of type B. House thus diagnoses Autoimmune hemolytic anemia in systemic lupus erythematosus; and as he has never diagnosed any Lupus erythematosus before—"It's not lupus - it's never lupus."—he quips, "I finally have a case of lupus."

Contest
A bored House announces a contest for the fellows, to test their ability to do sneaky things and not get caught. The winner will be spared from getting fired and will get to nominate two competitors, then House will fire one of those two. In a reference to the Peckinpah film Bring Me the Head of Alfredo Garcia, House issues the contest objective: to "bring me the thong of Lisa Cuddy." The winner is to bring the thong to the group. While House announces the contest, Kutner interrupts and tries to argue that the magician is actually ill, and is asked by House to leave and find some evidence or else get fired.

The Fellows, excluding Kutner, debate taking the challenge, but most of them decide to attempt it. Taub tries to spill coffee on Cuddy, but that does not work. Amber pages Cuddy to the clinic, then sets off the clinic's fire alarm. But Taub keeps Cuddy in her office, away from the clinic's sprinklers.

Later, Taub gives House a pair of black panties, claiming them to be Cuddy's. But House says that Cuddy is wearing a red bra, and he deduces that Cuddy would be wearing red panties to match. House suspects that they are Amber's panties, and asks her to lift her skirt to prove that they are not. She refuses, but they admit that they were hers when House points out that she is wearing a black bra.

Later, Cole produces Cuddy's panties. Amber demonstrates that this time they are not her own. House later drops his vicodin bottle so that Cuddy, in a tight skirt, will bend over to pick it up. He is amazed when he sees no panty line.

Amber tells Cole that he should make his nominations based on who is the best doctor, rather than his personal feelings towards her. Kutner reminds Cole that he is his friend and should not be nominated for elimination. Taub offers Cole $5,000 to keep him off the chopping block. Thirteen does not try to persuade Cole not to nominate her because she knows it would not make a difference in his decision.

At the end of the episode, House enters the lecture room with Cuddy's underwear on a pillow. He asks Cole to nominate two candidates. Cole chooses Amber and Kutner. House wonders why Cole would nominate Kutner, even though Kutner was the one who spotted that the magician was actually sick, and was also Cole's friend. House then realizes that Cole only managed to get Cuddy's panties by letting her choose whom she wanted House to fire—she believed Kutner a liability to the hospital due to his reckless behavior. However, as the fellows were supposed to accomplish their goal without getting caught, and letting Cuddy in on the contest counted as getting caught, House fires Cole for breaking the rules; House's motive for setting the contest was to identify who could conspire with him to trick Cuddy, but Cole ended up conspiring with Cuddy to fool House.

Thirteen
Thirteen drops her files, and seems very upset about it. House privately asks her why it bothered her so. He suspects she is hiding a medical condition from him, but she denies it. House later notices that Thirteen's hand is shaking, and she seems concerned about that as well. Later, House tells Thirteen that he saw a picture of her mother in her wallet. In the picture, her mother looked young, and House deduces that Thirteen didn't update the picture because her mother is dead. House Googled the obituary and learned that her mother died "after a long illness," and asks Thirteen if it was Parkinson's disease. Thirteen says that it was actually Huntington's, meaning that she has a 50% chance of also carrying the mutation that leads to the disease, which is what caused her to become upset when she dropped her files and when her hand shook. House says that the reason her hand shook is that he switched her decaf coffee with caffeinated to see her reactions; thus, Thirteen later drugs House as described above.

Thirteen refuses to be tested for Huntington's, because she says that not knowing her fate encourages her to live life to its fullest. This makes little sense to House, and when Thirteen leaves a bottle of water behind, House has her saliva from the bottle tested for the mutation. House later gives Thirteen an envelope with the results, but she refuses to open it and leaves the room after she lectured him about the importance of being ignorant to her possible illness. House appears to be persuaded by her, something the magician failed to do when he argued that not knowing the magic is part of the wonder. In the end, House tosses the unopened envelope into the trash.

References

External links 

 "You Don't Want to Know" at Fox.com
 

House (season 4) episodes
2007 American television episodes
Television episodes directed by Lesli Linka Glatter

fr:Les Dessous des cartes